Falls of Divach is a waterfall of Scotland.
Pronounced 'Jeevach', the Divach Burn falls 100 feet to the River Coiltie, which continues its course through Lewiston village, the "Cover", then into Urquhart Bay, half way along the northern shore of Loch Ness.

See also
Waterfalls of Scotland

References

Waterfalls of Highland (council area)